Patricia Anne Thirza Byrne (13 July 1933 – 17 June 2014) was an English actress, best known for her role as "Nursie" in Blackadder II as well as Malcolm's domineering Mother, Mrs Stoneway in all seven series of the ITV comedy Watching between 1987 and 1993.

Biography
Byrne was educated at Ashford County Grammar School. She studied drama at Rose Bruford College before joining the Royal Shakespeare Company playing parts such as Maria in Twelfth Night and Gruscha in The Caucasian Chalk Circle at the Aldwych Theatre in the early 1960s. In the 1980s she also worked at Chichester Festival Theatre.

Byrne starred alongside Tony Robinson in a Series 3 episode of Maid Marian and her Merry Men. She played Betty the Tea Lady on the BBC children's programme Playdays. Other roles included appearances in I, Claudius (1976), Stealing Heaven (1988), Inspector Morse (1989), 2point4 Children, Les Misérables (1998), David Copperfield (1999) and Kevin & Perry Go Large (2000), as well as numerous radio plays.  Byrne performed in the 1990 BBC production of C. S. Lewis' The Silver Chair as the giant nanny in the city of the giants. In 1998 she played Martha Coutts in episode 19 of series 7 of Heartbeat.

Death
Byrne died at Denville Hall, a retirement home for performers, on 17 June 2014.

Filmography

References

External links

Obituary, independent.co.uk; accessed 25 June 2014.

1933 births
2014 deaths
English television actresses
English film actresses
People from Bexhill-on-Sea
Royal Shakespeare Company members
Alumni of Rose Bruford College